"Perma," "PERMA," or "perma-" may refer to:

 Perma (Benin), a town and arrondissement
 Perma, Montana, a place in Sanders County, Montana, United States
 PERMA, the five components of positive psychology proposed by Martin Seligman

See also
 Perma.cc, a web archiving service for legal and academic citations